A Baltimore accent, also known as Baltimorese (sometimes jokingly written Bawlmerese or Ballimorese, to mimic the accent), commonly refers to an accent or sub-variety of Philadelphia English that originates among blue-collar residents of Baltimore, Maryland. It extends into the Baltimore metropolitan area and northeastern Maryland.

At the same time, there is considerable linguistic diversity within Baltimore, which complicates the notion of a singular "Baltimore accent". According to linguists, the accent of white blue-collar Baltimoreans is different than the African-American Vernacular English accent of black Baltimoreans. White working-class families who migrated out of Baltimore along the Maryland Route 140 and Maryland Route 26 corridors brought local pronunciations with them.

Pronunciation

The Baltimore accent that originated among white blue-collar residents closely resembles blue-collar Philadelphia-area English pronunciation in many ways. These two cities are the only major ports on the Eastern Seaboard never to have developed nonrhotic speech among European American speakers; they were greatly influenced in their early development by Hiberno-English, Scottish English, and West Country English. Due to the significant similarity between the speeches of Baltimore, Philadelphia, Delaware and southern New Jersey, sociolinguists refer to them collectively as the Mid-Atlantic regional dialect. For example, a word like bureau is commonly pronounced  (e.g., Federal Beer-o of Investigation) and mirror is commonly pronounced "mere"; the related mare–mayor merger also exists.

Vowels
When word-final and spelled as -ow, it is pronounced like , resulting in colloquial or humorous spellings like pilla for pillow and winda for window.
No cot–caught merger: The words cot  and caught  do not rhyme, with the latter vowel maintaining a raised position. Likewise, the word on rhymes with dawn and not don.
As in Philadelphia, the word water is often pronounced as wooder  or, more uniquely, warter .
As in most Mid-Atlantic cities, short a is pronounced with a phonemic split: for example, the word sad  does not rhyme with the word mad . Pronunciation is dependent upon a complex system of rules that differ from city to city. Baltimore follows the Philadelphia pattern. For more details on the Philadelphia, New York, and Baltimore systems see :/æ/ raising.

This pattern has also been noted to occur in Philadelphia and New York.
Canadian raising occurs for  before voiceless consonants, as in Philadelphia; for instance, the word like [ɫʌɪk] begins with a higher nucleus than live [ɫaɪv].
"Because they came from afar."
 is often eliminated entirely from a word when before a consonant; e.g. Annapolis = Naplis, cigarette = cigrette, company = compny, Italy = Itly.

Consonants
Th–stopping occurs, where the dental fricatives  may be realized as stops ( respectively); for instance, this may sound more like diss.
L–vocalization is common at the end of a word. Pronunciation of words like middle and college become  and  respectively.
As is common in many US dialects,  is frequently elided after , thus hunter is pronounced .

Lexicon

The following is a list of words and phrases used in the Baltimore area that are used much less or differently in other American English dialects.
down the ocean – (eye-dialect spellings include dayown the ocean or downy ocean) "down to/on/at the ocean", most likely referring to Ocean City, Maryland.
hon – a popular term of endearment, short for honey, often used at the end of a sentence. This word has been a popular marker of Baltimore culture, as represented in the annual Honfest summer festival and in landmarks such as the Hontown store and the Café Hon restaurant.
natty boh – local slang for the beer originally brewed in Baltimore, National Bohemian.
pavement (commonly pronounced "payment") – means "sidewalk" (which is used rarely).
went up (shortened from "went up to heaven") – commonly used when an appliance dies; e.g., our refrigerator went up
yo – as a gender-neutral third-person singular pronoun

African-American Baltimore English includes the words lor for "little", rey for ready (associated with Baltimore users of Black Twitter), and woe for a close friend.

Ethnic variation 
According to linguists, the "hon" dialect that is popularized in the media and that derives historically from the speech of by white blue-collar residents of South and Southeast Baltimore is not the only accent spoken in the region. There is also a particular Baltimore accent found among black Baltimoreans: a sub-type of African-American Vernacular English.

For example, among black speakers, Baltimore is pronounced more like "Baldamore," as compared to "Bawlmer."
The African-American Baltimore accent, or a variation thereof, is also shared by many African Americans throughout Maryland, and is present among African Americans in Washington, D.C., Prince George's County, Montgomery County, and other parts of the Washington D.C. Metropolitan Area.

Although the white Baltimore accent has historically been analyzed and popularized in media more than the African-American Baltimore accent, the latter has gained fame on the internet through internet memes spread through social media, such as the "Baltimore accent challenge", and a video of a Baltimorean barber speaking and singing in an exaggerated Baltimore accent that has become popular as a meme on YouTube.

Notable examples of native speakers

Lifelong speakers
Ben Cardin –  Maryland U.S. Senator (2007–present)
Mary Pat Clarke –  Baltimore City Councilwoman (1975–present)
Divine –  Actor/Performer
Charley Eckman –  NBA coach and referee, sportscaster
Mel Kiper Jr. –  Football analyst for ESPN
Barbara Mikulski –  Maryland U.S. Senator (1987– 2017)
Felicia Pearson –  Actress on The Wire
Babe Ruth –  Baseball Hall of Famer
John Waters –  Actor/Filmmaker
Nancy Pelosi –  U.S. House Speaker from Baltimore

In popular culture

Films
The films of John Waters, many of which have been filmed in and around Baltimore, often attempt to capture the Baltimore accent, particularly the early films. For example, John Waters uses his own Baltimore accent in the commentary during his film Pink Flamingos. John Travolta's character in the 2007 version of John Waters's Hairspray spoke with an exaggerated Baltimore accent. Likewise, several of the films of Barry Levinson are set in and around Baltimore during the 1940s-1960s, and employ the Baltimore accent. Michael Tucker who was born and raised in Baltimore, speaks with a West Baltimore accent.

Television
Television drama series Homicide: Life on the Streets and The Wire are both set in Baltimore and in some cases include actors who are native white and black Baltimoreans. In the early Homicide: Life on the Streets episode "Three Men and Adena", a suspect, Risley Tucker, describes how he can tell whereabouts in or around the city a person comes from simply by whether they pronounce the city's name as "Balti-maw", "Balti-moh", or "Bawl-mer".

In Season 4, Episode 7 of The Tracey Ullman Show, Baltimore actor Michael Tucker portrays the father of Ullman's character JoJo. The skit is set in a Baltimore row house. Tucker advises Ullman to "take a Liverpool accent and Americanize it." The episode called "The Stoops" begins with Tracey washing her marble stoops, which are the most common small porches attached to most Baltimore town homes (called row houses in Baltimore).

In the 30 Rock episode, "I Do Do", Elizabeth Banks parodies the accent by portraying Avery Jessup, the spokesperson for the fictional Overshoppe.com in a flashback scene.

Kathy Bates' character on the "Freak Show" season of American Horror Story was inspired by a Baltimore accent.

Whether it was on his ESPN Radio show or SportsCenter at Night, Scott Van Pelt always ended his segments with Tim Kurkjian by mentioning names in a Baltimore accent featuring at least one fronted 'o'.

Music
Singer-songwriter Mary Prankster uses several examples of Baltimore slang in her song, "Blue Skies Over Dundalk," from the album of the same name, including, "There'll be O's fans going downy ocean, hon."

Podcasts
Jason La Canfora, host of the B-More Opinionated podcast with Jerry Coleman and resident of Dundalk, regularly discussed events of the National Football League for The Tony Kornheiser Show and will end the segment plugging his own podcast in a heavy Baltimore accent. The accent is so distinct that his dog, Copper, will react to it, barking constantly because he knows it is time for a walk.

Comedians Stavros Halkias and Nick Mullen of the Cum Town podcast both hail from the Baltimore/DMV area and use the accent to discuss topics and stories related to Baltimore and the Mid-Atlantic region. Halkias's recurring Dundalk Ralph character is frequently used to mock the white working class culture of the Dundalk suburb.

See also

Culture of Baltimore
List of people from Baltimore
Regional vocabularies of American English

References

Bibliography

External links
Baltimore Hon (A through dictionary of Baltimorese)
 Baltimorese (with some audio)
 "The Mid-Atlantic Dialects", Evolution Publishing
In March 2011, the VOA Special English service of the Voice of America broadcast a 15-minute feature on Bawlmerese, written and voiced by longtime VOA Special English announcer, photographer, voice-over artist, and Baltimore native Steve Ember. A transcript and MP3 of the program – intended for those want to learn American English – can be found at An Extended Lesson in Bawlmerese

American English
American slang
City colloquials
European-American culture in Baltimore
White American culture in Baltimore
Working-class culture in Baltimore
Languages of Maryland